Multiplicity may refer to:

In science and the humanities
 Multiplicity (mathematics), the number of times an element is repeated in a multiset
 Multiplicity (philosophy), a philosophical concept
 Multiplicity (psychology), having or using multiple personalities
 Multiplicity (chemistry), multiplicity in quantum chemistry is a function of angular spin momentum
 Multiplicity (software), a software application which allows a user to control two or more computers from one mouse and keyboard
 Multiplicity, a type of relationship in class diagrams for Unified Modeling Language used in software engineering
 Multiplicity (statistical mechanics), the number of  microstates corresponding to a particular macrostate in a thermodynamic system, symbolized by the Greek letter Ω
 Statistical multiplicity, also known as the problem of multiple comparisons.

In the arts
 Multiplicity (film), a 1996 comedy film starring Michael Keaton
 Multiplicity (album), 2005 studio album by Dave Weckl